Man Against Man (German:Mann gegen Mann) is a 1928 German silent thriller film directed by Harry Piel and starring Piel, Dary Holm and Fritz Beckmann.

Cast
 Harry Piel as Harry Paulsen 
 Dary Holm as Miß Gladys Norton 
 Fritz Beckmann as Bartholomeo, Wirt der Schmugglerschenke 
 Hertha von Walther as Emita 
 Philipp Manning as Fuessli 
 Eugen Burg as Berner 
 Georg John as Zamok 
 Charly Berger as Porter 
 Charles Francois as Kanzow

References

Bibliography
 Kreimeier, Klaus. The Ufa Story: A History of Germany's Greatest Film Company, 1918-1945. University of California Press, 1999.

External links

1928 films
Films of the Weimar Republic
German silent feature films
German thriller films
1920s thriller films
Films directed by Harry Piel
UFA GmbH films
German black-and-white films
Silent thriller films
1920s German films